Firuzabad (also Romanized as Fīrūzābād; also known as Pīrūzābād) is a village in Shur Dasht Rural District, Shara District, Hamadan County, Hamadan Province, Iran. At the 2006 census, its population was 67, in 15 families.

References 

Populated places in Hamadan County